Saint Mark's Coptic Orthodox Cathedral is a Coptic church in Alexandria, Egypt. It is the historical seat of the Pope of Alexandria, the head of the Coptic Orthodox Church.

On Palm Sunday, 9 April 2017, an Islamic State operative detonated his suicide belt in the cathedral, killing 17 people and wounding 48.

Beginning
The cathedral is said to stand on the site of the church founded by St. Mark the Evangelist in AD 42.

St. Mark the Evangelist (author of the second Gospel) has been connected with the city of Alexandria since earliest Christian tradition. Coptic Christians believe he arrived in Alexandria around AD 42 and stayed for about seven years.

During this time, Mark converted many to Christianity and performed many miracles. He is considered the founder of the church in Alexandria and the first Bishop of Alexandria. According to tradition, St. Mark was arrested during a festival of Serapis in AD 68 and martyred by being dragged through the streets. He was buried under the church he had founded.

Relics of Saint Mark
In 828, relics believed to be the body of St. Mark were stolen from Alexandria by Venetian merchants and taken to Venice. Copts believe that the head of St. Mark remains in a church named after him in Alexandria, and parts of his relics are in St. Mark's Cairo's Cathedral. The rest of what are believed to be his relics are in the St Mark's Basilica in Venice, Italy. Every year, on the 30th day of the month of Paopi, the Coptic Orthodox Church celebrates the commemoration of the consecration of the church of St. Mark, and the appearance of the head of the saint in the city of Alexandria. This takes place inside St. Mark Coptic Orthodox Cathedral in Alexandria, where the saint's head is preserved.

The head of St. Mark was moved around a great deal over the centuries, and has been lost for over 250 years. Some of the relics from the body of St. Mark, however, were returned to Alexandria from Rome in 1968 during the papacy of Coptic Pope Cyril VI.

The present St. Mark's Coptic Cathedral is of recent date, but is said to stand on the site of church founded by St. Mark himself.

History

In AD 311, before the martyrdom of Pope Peter the Last of Martyrs, he prayed a last prayer on the grave of Saint Mark, the church was then a little chapel on the eastern coast, and it contained bodies said to be of Saint Mark and some of his holy successors.  The church was later enlarged in the days of Pope Achillas, the 18th Pope.

The church was greatly ruined in 641 when the Arabs invaded Egypt.  In 680 Pope John III rebuilt the church.  In 828, the body of Saint Mark was stolen by Italian sailors and was taken from Alexandria to Venice in Italy. However, Saint Mark's head remained in Alexandria.

The church was destroyed again in 1219, during the time of the crusades, then it was rebuilt once more. Sixteenth-century French explorer Pierre Belon mentions the founding of the church in 1547.

The church was pulled down during the French invasion of Alexandria in July 1798.  The church was rebuilt and opened in 1819 by Pope Peter El Gawly in the time of Mohammed Ali Pasha. The church was renewed in the time of Pope Demetrius II and by the supervision of Bishop Marcos of El Behira in 1870. Between the years 1950–1952, in the time of Pope Yusab II, the church building was pulled down and another, larger  building was built with reinforced concrete after the basilique style. The six marble pillars were transferred into the outer entrance of the church. The icon carrier was accurately cut into parts, each part given a number, and then it was cautiously returned to where it was originally. The two bell tower  were not pulled down as they were reinforced with concrete and were decorated with beautiful Coptic engravings. Two new bells – brought from Italy – were provided, one for each bell tower.

Between 1985 and 1990, the church was widened from the western side after the former style with great accuracy, keeping the two bell tower in their places, so the entire area of the church was doubled. The six pillars were transferred to the new western entrance of the church supervised by Pope Shenouda III.

See also
List of Coptic Orthodox churches in Egypt
Saint Mark's Coptic Orthodox Cathedral (Azbakeya)
Saint Mark's Coptic Orthodox Cathedral (Cairo)

References

External links

Saint Mark's Coptic orthodox Cathedral (Alexandria)

Coptic Orthodox churches in Egypt
Copts in Alexandria
Churches in Alexandria
Cathedrals in Egypt
Burial places of popes
Oriental Orthodox congregations established in the 7th century
Oriental Orthodox cathedrals in Egypt
Religious buildings and structures in Alexandria
1810s establishments in Egypt
19th-century Oriental Orthodox church buildings
19th-century churches in Egypt